Frontignan is a commune in the Hérault department in southern France.

Frontignan is renowned for its AOC wine, the Muscat de Frontignan, a sweet wine made solely from the Muscat grape variety.

Geography

Frontignan is located in the Languedoc coastal plain between the towns of Sète and Montpellier.

The town is surrounded by the Gardiole hills to the north, the Ingril lagoon in the east, the Étang de Thau to the west and the Mediterranean shore (including the beach resort Frontignan-Plage) to the south.

The Rhône-Sète canal separates the inland town centre and Frontignan-Plage. Frontignan station has rail connections (TER Occitanie) to Narbonne, Montpellier and Avignon.

History
 1362 foundation of the fortress
 1560 ransacked by the Protestants
 16 June 1642: King Louis XIII of France and Cardinal Richelieu meet in Frontignan.
 1787: Thomas Jefferson, future president of the United States, stays in Frontignan and reportedly enjoys the local Muscat de Frontignan wine.
 28 June 1940: The car driven by Paul Reynaud hits a tree at La Peyrade, killing his mistress Helene de Portes. Reynaud is hospitalized, arrested on discharge, and imprisoned for the duration of the war. 
 25 June 1944: The Frontignan oil refineries and parts of the city (including the rail station) are bombed by the 15th USAAF causing some 40 civilian deaths.
 12 August 1944:Battery Frontignan is attacked by the 465th BG in preparation of the invasion of Southern France on 15 August 1944.
 31 December 2002: Frontignan together with the neighboring towns of Sète, Balaruc-les-Bains, Balaruc-le-Vieux, Vic-la-Gardiole, Mireval, Gigean and Marseillan joins the Communauté d'agglomération du Bassin de Thau (since 2017: Sète Agglopôle Méditerranée).

Population
In 1800, Frontignan was home to around 1400 individuals. Until the 20th century, Frontignan had a population of less than 4000. In 2007, there were over 23,000.

Sights

 Old town centre with remains of the fortress dating back to the 14th century
 Saint Paul's Church (in parts 12th century)
 The Penitents' chapel (including the city's museum)
 Maison Population (early 20th century)
 Château Stony
 Château de la Peyrade
 La Peyrade bridge (17th century)
 Yacht port
 Natural reserve beaches
 Aresquiers natural reserve
 Argeliès caves

Economy

Until the early 20th century the local economy was based on the production of marine salt and wine. Later petro-chemical and chemical industries predominate with a steady decline in the 1980s. The oil refinery that opened in 1900 was converted to a simple depot in 1986.

Since the end of the 20th century, modern fisheries and high-tech plastics take over. Seasonal tourism is a dominant part of the local economy.

Important businesses in Frontignan include:
 Distrisud S.A.
 Indubois S.A.S.
 Hexis S.A.
 Barba S.A.S.
 Frontignan Coopérative S.C.A.
 Mobil Concepts s.à.r.l.

Culture
Frontignan is the hometown of the writer Maurice Clavel.
Every year since 1998 Frontignan organises the annual Festival International du Roman Noir (for noir fiction).
Bullfighting and river jousting are the traditional sports.

International relations
Frontignan is twinned with:
  Gaeta, Italy
  Vizela, Portugal
  Pineda de Mar, Spain
  M'Diq, Morocco

See also
Communes of the Hérault department

References

External links

 Official website 
 Frontignan Tourist Office 
 FIRN  website of the Festival International du Roman Noir 
 Website for Association des Plaisanciers du Port de Frontignan 
  Website of panoramic photos of Frontignan and its region

Communes of Hérault
Languedoc-Roussillon wine AOCs
Hérault
Seaside resorts in France